Halen, formerly Haelen, is a city and municipality located in the Belgian province of Limburg, to the west of Hasselt. On January 1, 2018, Halen had a total population of 9,461. The total area is 36.29 km² which gives a population density of 261 inhabitants per km².

The municipality consists of the following sub-municipalities: Halen proper, Loksbergen, and Zelem.

During the First World War, on August 12, 1914, the Battle of Halen took place here near the river crossing of the Gete.

References

External links
 
 
  Official website

Municipalities of Limburg (Belgium)